Roaring Branch is a stream in the U.S. state of Georgia. It empties into Lake Oliver.

A variant name is "Roaring Creek". The name Roaring Creek first appeared in the 1820s.

References

Rivers of Georgia (U.S. state)
Rivers of Muscogee County, Georgia